The Truth is a fantasy novel by British writer Terry Pratchett, the twenty-fifth book in his Discworld series, published in 2000.

The book features the coming of movable type to Ankh-Morpork, and the founding of the Discworld's first newspaper by William de Worde, as he invents investigative journalism with the help of his reporter Sacharissa Cripslock. The two investigate the charges of embezzlement and attempted murder against Havelock Vetinari, and help vindicate him.

The Ankh-Morpork City Watch characters also appear in this novel, but have limited roles and are seen mainly from de Worde's perspective. C.M.O.T. Dibbler also makes an appearance.

Plot
William de Worde is the black sheep of an influential Ankh-Morpork family, scraping out a humble lifestyle as a common scribe and making extra pocket money by producing a gossipy newsletter for foreign notables. This arrangement is soon undermined by the arrival of a team of dwarves to Ankh-Morpork who intend to start a printing business using moveable type, a technology hitherto outlawed in the city due in part to the unpredictable consequences of its use in producing magical texts (although the dwarves' reasonable rates and promise of an annual dinner mollify the wizards at Unseen University). De Worde and the dwarves establish The Ankh-Morpork Times later employing Sacharissa Cripslock and Otto, a black-ribbon vampire and iconographer. The Guild of Engravers is antagonised by the unauthorised efforts of the Times; in response, the Guild cuts off their paper supplies and establish the rival newspaper The Ankh-Morpork Inquirer, a loss-making tabloid filled with popular fabricated stories, often about unlikely events in far-off countries.

Meanwhile, a conspiracy is afoot in the city to depose the Patrician, Lord Vetinari. The wealthy and powerful (but anonymous) Committee to Unelect the Patrician hire Mr. Pin and Mr. Tulip, a pair of villainous mercenaries from outside Ankh-Morpork known as the New Firm, to frame Vetinari with a staged embezzlement and replace him with a puppet, the President of the Guild of Shoemakers and Leatherworkers, Tuttle Scrope. Pin and Tulip manage to catch off-guard the normally impassible Patrician with Charlie, a witless Vetinari look-alike that they had previously kidnapped in Pseudopolis and forced to collaborate. The plan starts going awry, though, when Drumknott, Vetinari's clerk returns in the middle of the scene and the New Firm is forced to stab him and render Vetinari unconscious, hoping to also frame him for murder; their efforts are hampered by Lord Vetinari's prized terrier, Wuffles, who bites Mr. Pin and escapes, becoming the sole witness to the crime.

William makes the mistake of advertising a reward for information leading to Wuffles' recovery, causing a frenzy among the local Ankh Morpork population. Disguised as Omnian clergy, the New Firm attempt to gather information about Wuffles from the Times but are frightened off by Otto's experimental dark-light 'obscurograph' technology (which unpredictably produces images of the past, the future or what is "really there"). Realising that the job is much harder than their employers had initially suggested, the New Firm decides to skip town. Although the job is unfinished they extort from their employers' zombie lawyer and representative Mr. Slant their promised payment and a big "bonus" in jewels, using compromising previous voice recordings captured with a dis-organiser Mk II.

An anonymous tipster named "Deep Bone", helps William track down Wuffles and "translate" his testimony, giving William the last pieces of the puzzle. In the meantime, Sacharissa accidentally discovers the New Firm's hideout in the de Worde family townhouse and is captured by the pair of thugs. They head back to the Times hoping to exchange her for Wuffles and then, silence all witnesses. In the ensuing struggle a lamp explodes and the Times offices catch fire. William and the others manage to escape outside while Pin and Tulip hide in the cellar. Pin, now only partially sane due to the  dark-light giving him visions of the New Firm's deceased victims, emerges from the cellars, having killed Tulip to steal his potato (which he believed would allow him reincarnate after death) and to use him as a raft against molten lead, and attacks William once the fire is out, only to be killed when he is impaled on the memo spike from William's desk. William retrieves the fortune in jewels, the dis-organiser, and the last bit of evidence. However, with the press and office destroyed, it seems like the Times will not be able to go live with their break-out reportage in time. The liberal application of a crossbow wielded by a daring Saccharisa, dwarven axes, bribery in jewels, and Otto's sense of dramatic atmosphere helps the crew borrow one of the Inquirer'''s presses for the evening. After discovering that 'Cut Me Own Throat' Dibbler was hired by the Inquirer as its editor, William and Sacharissa hire him to sell advertising space in the Times.
 
The big story breaks the next day and Lord Vetinari's name is cleared just before the new, Guild-controlled Patrician would have seized power, but ordinary citizens are unperturbed by this revelation. The recordings on the dis-organiser help William to discover the identity of the man behind the Committee, his father Lord de Worde. He decides to confront him. A tense argument, blackmail with the threat of exposure, a fortune in jewels, and threats from Otto fail to intimidate Lord de Worde into leaving the city in exile as William demands. However, after learning that his machinations nearly killed his own son, Lord de Worde admits defeat and walks away, begrudgingly admiring William's demonstration of traditional de Worde cunning. With William still in possession of the dis-organiser, he manages to pressure Slant into providing his services pro bono to get him released from Watch custody and to resolve his dispute with the Engravers' Guild.

William is ambivalent about the new and unexpected role of the free press in his life and in the world but resolves that someone must tell the public the truth about what goes on in the city, even if the public does not want to hear it. The Times comes to be recognized, if not exactly welcomed, by the powers that be in the city, and William and Sacharissa make plans to expand even further, hiring new staff, establishing offices in other cities, and hopefully one day squeezing in time for a lunch date in between deadlines, although their attempt to bunk off work leads them to witness and report a news-worthy cart crash. Tulip and Pin, with the former feeling sorry for his past crimes and having strong faith in a misunderstanding from his childhood, and the latter being relieved not to suffer vengeance after death, are reincarnated as a woodworm and a chipping potato, respectively.

Characters

Otto Chriek
Sacharissa Cripslock
Gunilla Goodmountain
Mr. Pin
Mr. Tulip
Havelock Vetinari
William de Worde
Lord de Worde
Mr Slant

Reception
At the SF Site, Steven H Silver judged that Pratchett's decision to present the novel from William's viewpoint "infused (it) with a freshness that has been lacking from many of Pratchett's (then-)recent books". CNN called it "technically a fantasy novel, but an unconventional one. And a funny one — the laugh-out-loud kind of funny that comes along all too infrequently," stating that Pratchett was a "master at wordplay" and that the novel was full of "striking example(s) of linguistic gymnastics".Infinity Plus described it as an "excellently plotted tale of mystery and murder" and "an hilarious take on the newspaper business", faulting only that the book's title was "descriptive" but insufficiently "fun".Publishers Weekly considered it "Pratchett's best one yet", and noted parodic similarities to Pulp Fiction and His Girl Friday. MIT Technology Review'' observed that it "combines humor and political satire to great effect" and compared it to the work of Oscar Wilde, but felt that it relied too strongly on coincidence, that there was insufficient closure to some of the plot threads, and that "some of the dialogue tries too hard to be witty", ultimately concluding that although it may be "quite unfair to set [Pratchett] to higher standards than other [authors]", the quality of work he produced would naturally lead readers to have heightened expectations.

References

External links

 
Annotations for The Truth
Quotes from The Truth

2000 British novels
Discworld books
2000 fantasy novels
Doubleday (publisher) books
British comedy novels